What We Did on Our Holidays (released as Fairport Convention in the United States) is the second album by British band Fairport Convention, released in 1969. It was their first album to feature singer-songwriter Sandy Denny. The album also showed a move towards the folk rock for which the band became noted, including tracks later to become perennial favourites such as "Fotheringay" and the song traditionally used to close live concerts, "Meet on the Ledge".

History
Following the departure of Judy Dyble, the band conducted auditions for a replacement singer, and Sandy Denny became the obvious choice. Simon Nicol has said "it was a one horse race really... she stood out like a clean glass in a sink full of dirty dishes". According to author Richie Unterberger Denny's "haunting, ethereal vocals gave Fairport a big boost".

The album has been described by Unterberger as "a near-ideal balance between imaginative reworkings of traditional folk songs ... quality covers of contemporary folk-rock singer-songwriters, some quite obscure ... and original folk-rock material by various members". In 2008 Simon Nicol described the album as his favourite, and it was voted number 281 in Colin Larkin's All Time Top 1000 Albums (2000).

The cover features a sketch of the band performing, drawn on a blackboard by Martin Lamble and Sandy Denny in a classroom at the University of Essex 
 and the reverse of the original sleeve shows a photograph of the band performing. The Island Masters 1990 re-release IMCD 97 also features a portrait of Sandy Denny.

In the USA, the album was released by A&M Records (SP-4185) with an identical track listing but featuring new cover art, and was re-titled Fairport Convention. The album was also released in Australia and New Zealand by Festival Records with the ‘blackboard’ front cover and an entirely different back cover to both the US and UK releases. The Discogs website gives no less than 54 different versions of the album.

Reception and influence

In a contemporary review for The Village Voice, American critic Robert Christgau deemed Fairport Convention the "most interesting unknown group" he had listened to in some time, highlighting their take on "Pentangle-style ballads" and Bob Dylan's "I'll Keep It with Mine". Neal Casal, of Ryan Adams & the Cardinals, later listed What We Did on Our Holidays as one of his favourite albums of all time.

Reviewing the 2008 re-issue of the album Pitchfork.com said: "The album mixes new interpretations of traditional ballads like "Nottamun Town", here rendered almost as a raga, with much newer songs, such as their soulful take on Dylan's "I'll Keep It With Mine" and their ponderous version of Mitchell's "Eastern Rain". The best material on Holidays, though, may be their own—the stomping blues-rock of "Mr. Lacey", the racing "No Man's Land", and the stirring afterlife anthem "Meet on the Ledge".

1999 album 
The album title was re-used for the 1999 CD release What We Did on Our Holidays - An Introduction to Fairport Convention on Island Records as IMCD 263.

Track listing

Personnel

Fairport Convention
 Sandy Denny (as Alexandra Elene MacLean Denny) – vocals, 6 & 12-string acoustic guitars, organ, piano, harpsichord
 Iain Matthews – vocals, congas
 Richard Thompson – electric, 6 & 12-string acoustic guitars, piano accordion, sitar on "Book Song" (uncredited), vocals
 Ashley Hutchings – bass, backing vocals
 Simon Nicol – electric & acoustic guitars, electric autoharp, electric dulcimer, backing vocals
 Martin Lamble – drums, percussion, violin, tabla & footsteps

Additional personnel
 Bruce Lacey & his robots on "Mr. Lacey"
 Claire Lowther – cello on "Book Song"
 Kingsley Abbott – coins on "The Lord Is in This Place...," backing vocals on "Meet on the Ledge"
 Paul Ghosh, Andrew Horvitch & Marc Ellington – backing vocals on "Meet on the Ledge"
 Peter Ross – harmonica on "Throwaway Street Puzzle"

Production and other credits
Recorded at Sound Techniques, London and Olympic Studio No. 1, London (except "The Lord Is in This Place..." recorded at St. Peter's Church, Westbourne Grove, West London). Further work recorded at Morgan Studios, London
Engineered by John Wood, Sound Techniques, London
Photography by Richard Bennett Zeff & Annie Brown
Design by Diogenic Attempts Ltd.

References

1969 albums
Fairport Convention albums
Island Records albums
Albums produced by Joe Boyd
A&M Records albums
Hannibal Records albums
Albums recorded at Olympic Sound Studios
Albums recorded at Morgan Sound Studios